Missisquoi can mean:

Places
Missisquoi Bay in Quebec and Vermont
Missisquoi River, river in Quebec and northern Vermont
Missisquoi River North, tributary of the Missisquoi River in Memphrémagog Regional County Municipality, Estrie, Quebec, Canada
Petite rivière Missisquoi Nord, tributary of the Missisquoi River North, Estrie, Quebec, Canada
Missisquoi County, Quebec, former county in Quebec now part of Brome-Missisquoi Regional County Municipality
Missisquoi (electoral district), former Canadian electoral district now known as Brome—Missisquoi
Missisquoi (provincial electoral district), former Quebec electoral district now merged into Brome-Missisquoi (provincial electoral district)
Missisquoi Railroad, now part of the Central Vermont Railway
Missisquoi National Wildlife Refuge in Vermont

People 
Missiquoi, also spelled Missisquoi, a Native American and First Nations tribe from northern Vermont now in southern Quebec and their 17th-century settlement in what is now Swanton, Vermont
 Missisquoi Abenaki Tribe, a state-recognized tribe in Vermont